Fidel Mbanga-Bauna (born 16 July 1948 in Yangambi) is an Italian journalist. He was the first non-Mediterranean broadcaster on RAI and at the time the only non-Italian newsreader of the main evening news.

filmography 

 A Policewoman in New York (1981)

References 

1948 births
Living people
Italian journalists
Italian male journalists
People from Tshopo